Joseph J. LaPorta (born ) is an American mastering engineer at Sterling Sound in New Jersey.

Career 

Born and raised in New York, LaPorta graduated from New York University with a bachelor's degree in Music Technology. He began his mastering career at The Lodge and then joined Sterling Sound in 2013 as a senior engineer.

He has amassed a body of work that includes artists like David Bowie, Kid Cudi, The Weeknd, Foo Fighters, Vampire Weekend, FKA Twigs, The Killers, Carrie Underwood, Tiesto, Imagine Dragons, Shawn Mendes, Fleet Foxes, Bon Jovi, 21 Savage, Future (rapper), Run the Jewels, Young Thug, Gunna (rapper), Beach House and others.

In addition to mastering, LaPorta also works as a music consultant on forensic musicology/copyright infringement cases. He has consulted on cases for The Beatles, Michael Jackson, Prince, Jay-Z, Britney Spears, Shakira, Guns N' Roses, Eminem, Mary J. Blige, Lady Gaga, The Black Eyed Peas, Sting, Phil Collins, Diddy, Alicia Keys and others.

LaPorta also has experience in music production, having worked with various artists in both hip hop and electronic dance music for over the past decade. He has written and produced for artists including 50 Cent, GZA, Talib Kweli, Pharoahe Monch and Cunninlynguists, as well as licensing tracks to TV and film clients such as MTV, Showtime and Fox Network.

Awards and Nominations 
Grammy Awards

|-
|2012
|Wasting Light
|Album of the Year
|
|-
|2012
|Radioactive
|Record of the Year
|
|-
|2017
|Blackstar
|Best Engineered Album, Non-Classical
|
|-
|2018
|Every Where Is Some Where
|Best Engineered Album, Non-Classical
|
|-
|2022
|Cinema
|Best Engineered Album, Non-Classical
|

Latin Grammy Awards

|-
|2014
|Multi Viral
|Album of the Year
|
|-
|2014
|Respira El Momento
|Record of the Year
|

TEC Awards

|-
|2012
|Wasting Light
|Record Production/Album
|
|-
|2016
|Smoke + Mirrors
|Record Production/Album
|
|-
|2017
|Blackstar
|Record Production/Single or Track
|
|-
|2017
|Blackstar
|Record Production/Album
|

Pensado Awards

|-
|2016
|Joe LaPorta
|"Masters of Mastering"
|

Selected works 

Music LaPorta has mastered includes:

 Young Thug So Much Fun (2019)
Shawn Mendes Shawn Mendes (album) (2018)
FKA Twigs Magdalene (album) (2019)
Dreamville Revenge of the Dreamers III (2019)
Vampire Weekend Modern Vampires of the City (2013)
Lil Peep Come Over When You're Sober, Pt. 1 (2017)
Solange Knowles When I Get Home (album) (2019)
Imagine Dragons Night Visions (2012)
David Bowie Blackstar (album) (2016)
Denzel Curry Zuu (2019)
Of Monsters and Men Fever Dream (Of Monsters and Men album) (2019)
Lil Wayne Tha Carter III (Remaster) (2008)
Foo Fighters Wasting Light (2011)
Carrie Underwood Cry Pretty (2018)
Skepta Ignorance Is Bliss (Skepta album) (2019)
Future (rapper) x Juice Wrld Wrld on Drugs (2018)
Beach House Bloom (Beach House album) (2012)
Walk the Moon Shut Up and Dance (Walk the Moon song) (2014)
21 Savage Issa Album (2017)
Rico Nasty x Kenny Beats Anger Management (2019)
Whitney (band) Light Upon the Lake (2016)
X Ambassadors VHS (album) (2015)
The Weeknd Kiss Land (2013)
Snail Mail (musician) Lush (album) (2018)
Phoenix (band) Ti Amo (album) (2017)
Freddie Gibbs x Currensy x The Alchemist (musician) Fetti (2018)
The Postal Service Give Up (Deluxe 10th Anniversary Edition) (2003)
Ghost (Swedish band)
Lauren Daigle Look Up Child (2018)
Leon Bridges Coming Home (Leon Bridges album) (2015)
Grizzly Bear (band) Painted Ruins (2017)
Big Sean & Metro Boomin Double or Nothing (Big Sean and Metro Boomin album) (2017)
Parquet Courts Wide Awake! (2018)
K.Flay Every Where Is Some Where (2017)
Run the Jewels Run the Jewels 3 (2016)
Bon Jovi This House Is Not for Sale (2016)
Armin van Buuren Embrace (Armin van Buuren album) (2015)
Rise Against Wolves (Rise Against album) (2017)
The Killers Battle Born (album) (2012)
Lil Peep HELLBOY (2020 – remaster)
Yeat 2 Alive (2022)

References 

Living people
American music arrangers
New York University alumni
1980 births